William I. Fine is an American politician who served as a member of the Indiana House of Representatives. He was a Republican member representing District 12 from 2014 to 2016. Fine was appointed to serve as the state's Office of Utility Consumer Counselor in 2016.

Early life, education and career
Fine is a Phi Beta Kappa graduate of Indiana University and earned a J.D. from Indiana University in 1976. He also hold a Masters in Arts in English from Purdue Calumet. Fine served as an attorney in Lake County until his appointment as Office of Utility Consumer Counselor.

Political career
In 2010, Fine ran a Republican candidate for Judge of the Lake Circuit Court.

In 2012, Fine ran for District 12, losing in the general election to Democrat Mara Candelaria Reardon. The two ran again in 2014, which Fine won. The two ran for a third time in 2016, won by Reardon.

Election results

2010

2012

2014

2016

References

External links 
 Official Website

Republican Party members of the Indiana House of Representatives
People from Hammond, Indiana
Living people
Year of birth missing (living people)